Rip is a nickname for:

 Rip Bachor (1901–1959), American football player
 Rip Coleman (1931–2004), American Major League Baseball pitcher
 Rip Collins (pitcher) (1896–1968), American Major League Baseball player
 Rip Collins (catcher) (1909–1969), American Major League Baseball backup catcher
 Albin Collins (born 1927), American National Football League player
 Rip Engle (1906–1983), American football player and coach of football and basketball
 John Salmon Ford (1815–1897), Republic of Texas and American politician, and Confederate Army colonel
 U. L. Gooch (born 1923), American pilot, aviation entrepreneur and politician
 Rip Hagerman (1888–1930), American Major League Baseball pitcher
 Richard Hamilton (basketball) (born 1978), American National Basketball Association player
 Rip Hawkins (born 1939), American National Football League player
 Rip King (1895-1950), American National Football League player
 Edgar Miller (American football) (1901–1991), American football player, coach and college athletics administrator
 Rip Radcliff (1906–1962), American Major League Baseball player
 H. Ripley Rawlings IV, New York Times bestselling author
 Rip Repulski (1928–1993), American Major League Baseball player
 Rip Russell (1915–1976), American Major League Baseball player
 Rip Scherer (born 1952), American college and National Football League coach and former college quarterback
 Rip Sewell (1907–1989), American Major League Baseball pitcher
 Rip Sullivan (born 1959), American politician and lawyer
 Rip Taylor (1935–2019), American comedian and actor
 Rip Torn (1931–2019), American actor
 Rip Vowinkel (1884–1966), American Major League Baseball pitcher in 1905
 Rip Wade (1898–1957), American Major League Baseball player in 1923
 Rip Wheeler (1921–1968), American Major League Baseball pitcher

See also
Rip (given name)

Lists of people by nickname